Sébastien Peineau (born 24 May 1987) is a French compound archer.
His best World Archery ranking is 1st place (on 28 March 2016). He won the bronze medal at the 2011 Archery European Indoor Championships in the men's team event.

He won the 2017 World Archery Championships in Mexico

Archery World Cup details
2014
 St. 1 Shanghai - Gold Individual

References

External links
 

1987 births
Living people
French male archers
20th-century French people
21st-century French people